Khalefa Ahmed Mohamed is a Sudanese defender playing for the Sudanese club Al-Hilal Omdurman in the Sudan Premier League. He is also a member of the Sudan national football team. He was brought from Ahli Madani in June 2009 on a free transfer. He scored his first goal for Al-Hilal in the Bani Yas International Tournament against the Emirates club Bani Yas when he scored in the last minute of stoppage time, after that Al-Hilal won penalty shootout.

References

Living people
Sudanese footballers
Sudan international footballers
2011 African Nations Championship players
2012 Africa Cup of Nations players
Al-Hilal Club (Omdurman) players
People from Khartoum
Association football midfielders
1983 births
Sudan A' international footballers